Sir John Denman Barlow, 2nd Baronet (15 June 1898 – 5 January 1986) was a British Conservative Party politician, and before that was a British Liberal Party member.

Barlow was the son of Sir John Barlow, 1st Baronet, and his wife the Hon. Anna Maria Barlow, daughter of Thomas, 3rd Baron Denman. 
He was educated at Leighton Park School in Reading along with his brother, Thomas, and numerous other well-known Quaker luminaries of the day. 

He initially worked in his father's hugely successful Far Eastern Trading business before standing as a Liberal candidate for Northwich in 1929, moving to the National Liberal Party and being elected for Eddisbury in 1945.

After unsuccessfully contesting Walsall in the 1950 election, Barlow was elected at the 1951 general election as Member of Parliament (MP) for Middleton and Prestwich, succeeding the Conservative Ernest Everard Gates.  He held his seat at the 1955 election, the 1959 election and the 1964 election. but at the 1966 general election, he was defeated by Labour's Denis Coe.

Barlow married the Hon. Helen Diana, daughter of George Kemp, 1st Baron Rochdale, in 1928. They had three sons and one daughter. He died in January 1986, aged 87, and was succeeded in the baronetcy by his eldest son John. Lady Barlow died the same year.

Notes

References
Kidd, Charles, Williamson, David (editors). Debrett's Peerage and Baronetage (1990 edition). New York: St Martin's Press, 1990,

External links 
 

1898 births
1986 deaths
Baronets in the Baronetage of the United Kingdom
Conservative Party (UK) MPs for English constituencies
UK MPs 1945–1950
UK MPs 1951–1955
UK MPs 1955–1959
UK MPs 1959–1964
UK MPs 1964–1966
People educated at Leighton Park School
Liberal Party (UK) parliamentary candidates